The 2016 Philippine Basketball Association (PBA) rookie draft was an event which allows teams to draft players from the amateur ranks. The league determined the drafting order based on the performance of the member teams for the 2015–16 season, with the worst team picking first, as a replacement for its lottery system after the controversies that surrounded the 2014 draft.

The league was supposed to hold a special draft for players from the national team, popularly called Gilas, separately from the regular one for other rookies. However, a consensus lead to an agreement that the cadet players will not be drafted but will be distributed to each team instead.

The event was held at the Midtown Atrium, Robinsons Place Manila on October 30, 2016.

Draft order
The draft order was determined based from the overall performance of the teams from the previous season. The Philippine Cup final ranking comprises 40% of the points, while the rankings of the Commissioner's and Governors' Cups are 30% each.

* - Phoenix's previous franchisee competed as the Barako Bull Energy during the Philippine Cup

Special draft for Gilas pool players
There was a separate draft for the players in the Gilas pool. The draft rights for the special draft could not be traded. The drafted Gilas players were not allowed to be traded for two years. All players were allowed to play for the teams that drafted them but were pulled out two months before an official FIBA tournament.

As part of the agreement between the PBA and the Samahang Basketbol ng Pilipinas, all 12 teams released one player from their roster to the Gilas pool, in addition to the player that they selected in this special draft.

The draft order was supposed to be announced on October 27. However, the PBA board agreed that instead of determining the order for the special draft, representatives from the 12 ballclubs agreed to farm out one cadet player per team that was distributed to each team by the board. The results of the consensus was not released during that day and the PBA opted to reveal the results on draft night before the regular draft began.

Draft

Special draft
Note: The Special draft for Gilas players is considered as the first round of the draft; the regular draft is listed as the second round onwards.

Regular draft

2nd round

Note: Rain or Shine (9th pick) and Alaska (11th) passed in this round

3rd round

4th round

Note: Blackwater, Star, Phoenix, NLEX, Barangay Ginebra and San Miguel passed in this round

5th round

Note: GlobalPort and Meralco passed in this round

6th round

Note: Mahindra passed in this round

Trades involving draft picks

Pre-draft trades
Note: The rights to Air21's and Barako Bull's draft picks were retained by NLEX and Phoenix respectively.

  On July 3, 2015, Barako Bull (now Phoenix) acquired a first round pick from GlobalPort in exchange for Joseph Yeo. Previously, the Batang Pier acquired this pick and a 2018 second round pick on August 24, 2014, from Star (as San Mig Coffee) in exchange for 2014 and 2016 first round picks. 
  On August 25, 2015, Ginebra acquired Nico Salva and a 2016 first round pick from Barako Bull (Phoenix) in exchange for Jens Knuttel, Emman Monfort, and Josh Urbiztondo.
  On August 24, 2014, Star (as San Mig Coffee) acquired 2014 and 2016 first round picks from GlobalPort in exchange for 2014 and 2016 first round picks.
  On July 25, 2014, San Miguel acquired a 2016 first round pick from NLEX in exchange for a 2015 first round pick.
  On January 20, 2014, Air21 (NLEX) acquired Sean Anthony, Eliud Poligrates, and a 2016 first round pick from Talk 'N Text in exchange for Niño Canaleta.
  On August 24, 2014, Phoenix (then known as Barako Bull) acquired Jojo Duncil, Chico Lañete, a second round pick and a 2016 first round pick from San Miguel in exchange for a first round pick.
  On October 27, 2016, Blackwater re-acquired a second round draft pick and acquired James Forrester from NLEX in exchange for Carlo Lastimosa. Previously, NLEX acquired the pick, a 2017 second round pick, and Juneric Baloria on September 12, 2014, from the Elite in a three-team trade with Meralco.
  On September 24, 2015, Rain or Shine acquired a second round pick from Barako Bull (Phoenix) in exchange for Ryan Araña. Previously, Barako Bull acquired this pick from Star in exchange for Josh Urbiztondo.
  On January 8, 2015, GlobalPort acquired a 2016 second round pick and Dennis Miranda from Barako Bull (Phoenix) in exchange for Sol Mercado.
  On October 7, 2015, Meralco acquired 2016 and 2017 second round picks from Mahindra in a three-team trade with NLEX. 
  
  On December 6, 2013, Rain or Shine acquired a 2016 second round pick from Air21 (NLEX) in exchange for Ronnie Matias.
  On October 11, 2013, GlobalPort acquired Chris Ross, Chris Timberlake, and 2016 and 2017 second round picks from Meralco in exchange for Gary David and A. J. Mandani.
  On October 8, 2015, Barako Bull (Phoenix) acquired a second round pick from Talk 'N Text in exchange for Dylan Ababou.
  
  On February 18, 2014, Barako Bull (Phoenix) acquired Jason Deutchman, and 2016 and 2017 second round picks from San Miguel in exchange for Rico Maierhofer in a four-team trade with GlobalPort and Air21 (NLEX).

Draft-day trades
None exercised.

Undrafted players
Out of 55 players who signified their intention to join the rookie draft, 38 were selected by their teams in the draft proper, while 16 were undrafted. Charles Caluya, the oldest (43) and the shortest (5'7) applicant for the draft, was excluded from the final list for health reasons.

Notes

References

External links
 PBA.ph

Philippine Basketball Association draft
draft
PBA draft